James Wesley "Red" Holloway (May 31, 1927 – February 25, 2012) was an American jazz saxophonist.

Biography
Born in Helena, Arkansas, Holloway started playing banjo and harmonica, switching to tenor saxophone when he was 12 years old. He graduated from DuSable High School in Chicago, where he had played in the school big band with Johnny Griffin and Eugene Wright, and went on to attend the city's Conservatory of Music. He joined the Army when he was 19 and became bandmaster for the U.S. Fifth Army Band, and after completing his military service returned to Chicago and played with Yusef Lateef and Dexter Gordon, among others. In 1948, he joined blues vocalist Roosevelt Sykes, and later played with other rhythm & blues musicians such as Willie Dixon, Junior Parker, and Lloyd Price.

In the 1950s, he played in the Chicago area with Billie Holiday, Muddy Waters, Chuck Berry, Ben Webster, Jimmy Rushing, Arthur Prysock, Dakota Staton, Eddie "Cleanhead" Vinson, Wardell Gray, Sonny Rollins, Red Rodney, Lester Young, Joe Williams, Redd Foxx, The Moonglows, B.B. King, Bobby Bland, and Aretha Franklin. During this period, he also toured with Sonny Stitt, Memphis Slim and Lionel Hampton. He became a member of the house band for Chance Records in 1952.  He subsequently appeared on many recording sessions for the Chicago-based independents Parrot, United and States, and Vee-Jay.

From 1963 to 1966, he was in organist "Brother" Jack McDuff's band, which also featured guitarist George Benson, who was then at the start of his career. In 1974, Holloway recorded The Latest Edition with John Mayall and toured Europe, Japan, Australia and New Zealand. From 1977 to 1982, Holloway worked with Sonny Stitt, recording two albums together, and following Stitt's death, Holloway played and recorded with Clark Terry.

Red Holloway died in Morro Bay, California, aged 84 of a stroke and kidney failure on February 25, 2012, one month after Etta James, with whom he had worked extensively. He was buried at Forest Lawn Memorial Park in the Hollywood Hills of Los Angeles.

Discography

As leader/co-leader
 The Burner (Prestige, 1963) with Big John Patton, Eric Gale
 Cookin' Together (Prestige, 1964) with Jack McDuff, George Benson; reissued on CD as Brother Red in 1995. 
 Sax, Strings & Soul (Prestige, 1964)
 Red Soul (Prestige, 1965) with Dr. Lonnie Smith, George Benson
 Forecast: Sonny & Red (Catalyst, 1976) with Sonny Stitt
 Partners (Catalyst, 1978) with Sonny Stitt
 Hittin' the Road Again (JAM [Jazz America Marketing], 1983) with Shuggie Otis
 Nica's Dream (Steeplechase, 1984) with Horace Parlan
 Red Holloway & Company (Concord, 1987) with Cedar Walton
 Locksmith Blues (Concord, 1989) with Clark Terry
 Live at the 1995 Floating Jazz Festival (Chiaroscuro, 1995 [rel. 1997]) with Harry "Sweets" Edison
 Grooveyard (JHM [JazzHausMusik, Germany] Records, 1996) with Matthias Bätzel Trio
 Day Dream (Tonewheel, 1997) with T.C. Pfeiler
 In the Red (HighNote, 1997) with Norman Simmons
 A Night of Blues & Ballads (JHM [JazzHausMusik, Germany] Records, 1998) with Matthias Bätzel Trio
 Standing Room Only (Chiaroscuro, 1998 [rel. 2000]) with Junior Mance, Phil Upchurch, O.C. Smith
 Keep That Groove Going! (Milestone, 2001) with Plas Johnson
 Coast to Coast (Milestone, 2003) with Dr. Lonnie Smith, Melvin Sparks
 Something Old, Something New (R/H [Red Holloway] Recording Company, 2007) with Sacha Boutros
 Go Red Go! (Delmark, 2008) with George Freeman, Henry Johnson, Chris Foreman, Greg Rockingham
 September Songs (Organic Music, 2009) with Bernhard Pichi Trio

Compilations
 The Best of Red Holloway & The Soul Organ Giants with Brother Jack McDuff & Lonnie Smith (Prestige, 1970) also with Big John Patton; contains two tracks from each album: The Burner (with Patton), Cookin' Together (with McDuff), Red Soul (with Smith).
 Legends of Acid Jazz: Red Holloway (Prestige, 1998) (compilation of The Burner + Red Soul)

As sideman
With Gene Ammons
Soul Summit Vol. 2 (Prestige, 1961-62 [rel. 1963]) with Etta Jones
Late Hour Special (Prestige, 1961-62 [rel. 1964])
Velvet Soul (Prestige, 1961-62 [rel. 1964])
Free Again (Prestige, 1972)
With George Benson
The New Boss Guitar of George Benson (Prestige, 1964) with Jack McDuff, Joe Dukes
With Freddy Cole
Live at Birdland West (LaserLight, 1992) with Jerry Byrd
With Joe Dukes
The Soulful Drums of Joe Dukes (Prestige, 1964) with Jack McDuff, George Benson
With Atle Hammer
Arizona Blues (Gemini Records, 1989)
With Etta James
12 Songs of Christmas (Private Music, 1998)
Heart of a Woman (Private Music, 1999)
Blue Gardenia (Private Music, 2001)
With Etta James and Eddie "Cleanhead" Vinson
Blues in the Night Volume One: The Early Show (Fantasy, 1986) with Jack McDuff, Shuggie Otis
The Late Show: Blues In The Night Volume 2 (Fantasy, 1987) with Jack McDuff, Shuggie Otis
With Junior Mance
The Floating Jazz Festival Trio [live] (Chiaroscuro, 1997, [rel. 1999]) with Henry Johnson
With Wade Marcus
Metamorphosis (Impulse!, 1976)
With John Mayall
Ten Years Are Gone (Polydor, 1973)
The Latest Edition (Polydor, 1974)
With Jack McDuff
Brother Jack McDuff Live!  (Prestige, 1963)
Brother Jack at the Jazz Workshop Live!  (Prestige, 1963)
Prelude (Prestige, 1963)
The Dynamic Jack McDuff (Prestige, 1964)
The Concert McDuff (Prestige, 1964)
Silk and Soul (Prestige, 1965)
Hot Barbeque (Prestige, 1965)
Walk On By (Prestige, 1966)
Hallelujah Time! (Prestige, 1963-66 [rel. 1967])
The Midnight Sun (Prestige, 1963-66 [rel. 1967])
Soul Circle (Prestige, 1964-66 [rel. 1968])
I Got a Woman (Prestige, 1964-66 [rel. 1969])
Steppin' Out (Prestige, 1961-66 [rel. 1969])
Tobacco Road (Atlantic, 1966)
Check This Out [live] (Cadet, 1972)
With Jimmy McGriff
The Dream Team (Milestone, 1997) 
With Carmen McRae
Fine and Mellow: Live at Birdland West (Concord, 1987) with Jack McDuff, Phil Upchurch
With Knut Riisnæs
Confessin' the Blues (Gemini Records, 1989 [rel. 1991])
The Gemini Twins (Gemini Records, 1992)
With Horace Silver
It's Got to Be Funky (Columbia, 1993)
Pencil Packin' Papa (Columbia, 1994)
With Clark Terry
Squeeze Me! (Chiaroscuro, 1989 [rel. 1991])
Top and Bottom: Live at the 1995 Floating Jazz Festival (Chiaroscuro, 1997)
With Joe Williams
Nothin' but the Blues (Delos, 1983) -with Eddie "Cleanhead" Vinson, Jack McDuff, Phil Upchurch

References

External links
Red Holloway Interview - NAMM Oral History Library (2006)

1927 births
2012 deaths
Soul-jazz saxophonists
People from Helena, Arkansas
Musicians from Arkansas
American male saxophonists
Prestige Records artists
Fantasy Records artists
SteepleChase Records artists
Milestone Records artists
HighNote Records artists
Gemini Records artists
Burials at Forest Lawn Memorial Park (Hollywood Hills)
Military personnel from Arkansas
United States Army Band musicians
American male jazz musicians
The Capp-Pierce Juggernaut members
Statesmen of Jazz members
20th-century American saxophonists